Yaingangpokpi is a village in the Imphal East District of Manipur, India. It is 24 km from Imphal. The major ethnic groups within the village are Meitei, Tangkhul.There are more than 5 private schools and 2 government schools And it's the birthplace of shagolsem makar Meetei @ Langenba.

.

Villages in Imphal East district